Fraddam is a village in west Cornwall, England, United Kingdom. It is two miles (3 km) southeast of Hayle. It is in the civil parish of Gwinear-Gwithian

References

External links

Villages in Cornwall